The 1973 World Archery Championships was the 27th edition of the event. It was held in Grenoble, France on 23–29 July 1973 and was organised by World Archery Federation (FITA).

It was the first World Championships to be held since Archery became an Olympic sport.

Medals summary

Recurve

Medals table

References

External links
 World Archery website
 Complete results

World Championship
World Archery
World Archery Championships
International archery competitions hosted by France